Evans Ngemba Obi (born 29 May 1985 in Owerri) is a Nigerian football goalkeeper who is playing for TSV Grünwald in the German Bezirksliga Oberbayern-Süd.

Career
Obi began his career 2005 with Academy Africa in München and had a trial with SV Heimstetten in June 2008, one month later was transferred to SV Heimstetten.

He was the first keeper for the reserve team from SV Heimstetten who plays in the German Kreisklasse 6 and the third keeper of the first team, who plays in the Landesliga Bayern. After 18 games in the Kreisklasse 6 for SV Heimstetten II left in July 2009 the club and joined than to SC Fürstenfeldbruck II. In summer 2011 signed for German Bezirksliga Oberbayern-Süd club TSV Grünwald.

International career
His first nominatation for the Super Eagles was on 18 November 2008.

Background
Obi was the first player ever from his former club SV Heimstetten who was nominated for a national game.

References

External links
 Aus der Kreisklasse ins Nationalteam
 Zehntliga-Torwart wird Nationalspieler

1985 births
Living people
People from Owerri
Nigerian footballers
Nigerian expatriate footballers
Nigeria international footballers
Association football goalkeepers
Expatriate footballers in Germany
SV Heimstetten players
Sportspeople from Imo State